Loosemore is a surname. Notable people with the surname include:

 Arnold Loosemore (1896–1924), English recipient of the Victoria Cross
 George Loosemore (1619–1682), English organist (brother of Henry and John)
 Henry Loosemore (d. 1670), English organist
 John Loosemore (1616–1681), English builder of pipe organs
 Sarah Loosemore (born 1971), Welsh tennis player